Enhanced Methods of Questioning is an EP released by Jello Biafra and the Guantanamo School of Medicine. It was released on May 24, 2011 on Alternative Tentacles. The name is a reference to enhanced interrogation techniques.

Track listing

Personnel
Jello Biafra - Vocals
Ralph Spight - Guitars, vocals
Jon Weiss - Drums, percussion
Billy Gould -  Bass guitar
Kimo Ball - Guitars

References

2009 EPs
Jello Biafra albums
Alternative Tentacles EPs
Hardcore punk EPs